Leann Fennelly (born 1990) is a camogie player and a student, who played in the 2009 All Ireland camogie final.

Background
Leann's father, Liam, gave distinguished service to Kilkenny in the forward line, whereas she has shown her mettle in the backs. Her father and six of his brothers played together to win the 1989 Leinster Senior Club Hurling Championship and four (Kevin, Seán, Ger and Liam) played together in the All Ireland hurling final of 1987. Her father's cousin Mary captained the 1976 Kilkenny All Ireland team and served as President of the Camogie Association.

Career
She already has six All-Ireland medals in her collection – one Under-16, three Minor, one Colleges and one Intermediate from 2008. Her senior debut was in 2009.

References

External links 
 Official Camogie Website
 Kilkenny Camogie Website
 of 2009 championship in On The Ball Official Camogie Magazine
 Fixtures and results for the 2009 O'Duffy Cup
 All-Ireland Senior Camogie Championship: Roll of Honour
 Video highlights of 2009 championship Part One and part two
 Video Highlights of 2009 All Ireland Senior Final
 Report of All Ireland final in Irish Times Independent and Examiner

1990 births
Living people
Kilkenny camogie players
UCD camogie players